Tebenna immutabilis is a moth of the family Choreutidae. It is known from the United States, including California.

The wingspan is 15–17 mm. Head and thorax brownish, the latter marked with three longitudinal metallic lines. The forewings are broad. The basal fourth is brownish ocherous. The outer margin of the ocherous area is nearly straight and farther from the base on the costa. There are pinkish or bluish metallic subcostal and median longitudinal streaks. The outer three-fourths of the wing is uniformly clother with broadly white-tipped dark brownish fuscous scales. Sometimes, there is a faint golden tinge on the middle costa region. The outer half of the wing is marked with patches of metallic scales superimposed on velvety black, the most prominent being three in a row in the outer half of the wing. The smallest of these is located within the cell and there is a larger angulated patch at the end of the cell. The third is transverse and parallel to the termen. There is a curved metallic streak found at two-thirds of the costa. In the apical part of the wing, there are three more or less broken black streaks ending in metallic scales. The underside is gray, with a single white spot at two-thirds of the costa. The hindwings are uniform brownish gray above, the apex is broadly rounded and the termen is evenly rounded. There is a white costal spot and sometimes two white bands found on the underside. The underside of the body is whitish.

References

External links
mothphotographersgroup

Tebenna
Moths described in 1927